The Deputy Prime Minister of South Korea is a senior member of the Cabinet of South Korea.

List of deputy prime ministers

See also 
Prime Minister of South Korea
List of prime ministers of South Korea
Politics of South Korea

References 

Government of South Korea